Lilar is a Flemish surname. Notable people with the surname include:

 Albert Lilar (1900–1976), Belgian politician
 Françoise Lilar, pen name of Françoise Mallet-Joris (1930–2016), Belgian author
 Suzanne Lilar (1901–1992), Belgian author

Surnames of Belgian origin